Omar Grant is an American Music executive who originally worked as the Road manager for Destiny's Child and now the Co-President of Roc Nation Records. Following his role as a tour manager, Omar has worked as an A&R for EMI Group Limited, Epic Records and Roc Nation. In A&R, Omar has worked with and/or introduced many notable artists, with famed artists as varied as Kelly Rowland, Rihanna, DJ Mustard, Kylie Minogue and others. Artists, to whose efforts Grant has contributed, have sold recorded music in vinyl, CD and digital form in excess of 100 million copies/digital sales.

Early life 
Born and Raised in the Soundview section of the South Bronx, New York.

Career
Omar Grant is a graduate of Adelphi University. After graduating college he took his first job as an assistant tour manager to Destiny's Child and then as tour manager for each of the three members individually including Kelly Rowland, Michelle Williams and Beyoncé. In 2006, Grant accepted a position as the creative director of urban A&R for EMI followed by senior director of A&R at Epic Records and A&R at Roc Nation. In 2015, Grant worked as an A&R on the soundtrack for the DreamWorks animated film entitled "Home".

Omar in 2010–11 was the A&R for Kelly Rowland's album "Here I am", that featured the hit Single "Motivation" which went #1 for eight weeks on the Urban Hip Hop Charts. The album also had the hit record "Lay It On Me" featuring Big Sean. The album was Rowland's highest selling album to date.

In 2011 Omar joined Roc Nation as an A&R at Roc Nation, Omar was the A&R on Rihanna's album "Unapologetic" The album was Rihanna's first #1 debut album, with first-week sales of 238,000. Worldwide sales of more than 4,000,000 to date. The album has so far featured the hit singles "Diamonds", "Pour it Up" and "Stay", "Loveeeeeee song" and "What Now" . The Album won a Grammy Award for Best Urban Contemporary Album at the 2014 Ceremony.

In 2013, Omar signed hit-maker producer/artist and DJ, DJ Mustard to Roc Nation for Management and as a recording artist on the label. Mustard went on to produce a huge run of hits earning him BMI Producer and Songwriter of The Year in 2015 BMI Awards. DJ Mustard is the only person ever to win both awards in the same year. In August 2014 DJ Mustard released his debut Album "10 Summers" which Omar was the A&R. The album featured songs such as "Down on me", "4 Digits" and "Face Down" featuring Lil Wayne, Big Sean, YG and Boosie Badazz. The album was released on Google Play the first week and was the most downloaded album on Google play that summer.

The Next album for DJ Mustard was Cold Summer. It was released on September 16, 2016, by Pu$haz Ink, Roc Nation and Republic Records. The majority of the album was produced entirely by DJ Mustard himself, and with the help of Omar Grant Mustard had feature guest appearances from YG, Ty Dolla $ign, Nipsey Hussle, RJ, Quavo, O.T. Genasis, Jeezy, Rich The Kid, TeeCee4800, K Camp, Nicki Minaj, Jeremih, Young Thug, Meek Mill, Ella Mai, Rick Ross, John Legend and James Fauntleroy.[1]

The album's lead single, called "Don't Hurt Me" was released on July 1, 2016. The song features guest appearances from Nicki Minaj and Jeremih, with the production that was provided by DJ Mustard and Twice as Nice.[2]

"Want Her" was released on February 28, 2017, as the album's second single. The song features guest appearances from YG and Quavo.

Omar also was the A&R on the Kylie Minogue album Kiss me Once, which was the twelfth studio album by the Australian recording Artist, the album met with positive reviews from music critic, many whom complimented Minogue's return to the mainstream.

Next for Omar was A&R on the soundtrack album Home by Rihanna and various artist, a 2015 animation film based on the 2007 children book The True Meaning of Smekday by Adam Rex. It was released on March 23, 2015, through Westbury Road and Roc Nation, making it her first release through both the labels. The album featured Clarence Coffee Jr., Kiesza, Charli XCX, Jacob Plant, and Jennifer Lopez.

Omar was the A&R on Rihanna's eighth studio album Anti, released on January 28, 2016, 
Anti topped the chart with 166,000 equivalent album units, 124,000 of which were pure sales, Rihanna's second number one album. Subsequently, it also debuted at number one on the US R&B/Hip-Hop Albums chart. Being involved in finding and developing all the songs on the album, Omar called in artist Party Next Door to write the hit single "Work" and organized Drake to lend vocals on the feature. The song is currently Number 1 on the Hot 100 for eight consecutive weeks.

After Anti, Omar as A&R helped Big Sean achieve his second number one album on the Billboard 200 chart, as I Decided debuted at the top. It earned 151,000 equivalent album units in the week of February 9, according to Nielsen Music. 65,000 of the amount were in pure album sales.[41] As of April 18, 2017, I Decided was certified gold.[42]

References

Year of birth missing (living people)
Living people
A&R people